Aayusu Nooru is a 1987 Indian Tamil-language film directed by Ponmani Rajan and produced by M. D. Kalairajan for Sampath Creations. It stars Pandiarajan, Pandiyan and Ranjini. It was released on 20 November 1987.

Plot

Cast 
Pandiarajan
Pandiyan
Ranjini
Senthil
Bayilvan Ranganathan
Omakuchi Narasimhan

Soundtrack 
Soundtrack was composed by T. Rajendar.
"Aavani Masathula" – Malaysia Vasudevan, S. Janaki
"Brahmadevan" – Mano, K. S. Chithra
"Kummi Adikkira" – Gangai Amaran
"Etri Vaitha" – P. Jayachandran
"Chinna Ponnu" – Mano, Vani Jairam

Reception 
The Indian Express wrote "Aayusu Nooru is one of those unpretentious films based on rural subject; [..] There are poignant situations that the director has handled with some degree of competence".

References

External links 

1980s romance films
1980s Tamil-language films
1987 films
Films scored by T. Rajendar
Indian romance films